Clohessy is a surname. Notable people with the surname include:

David Clohessy, once-Roman Catholic American activist
Paddy Clohessy (1908–1971), Irish sportsperson and Fianna Fáil politician
Peadar Clohessy (1934–2014), Irish Fianna Fáil and Progressive Democrats politician
Peter Clohessy (born 1966), former Irish rugby union footballer
Robert Clohessy (born 1958), American actor, played Sean Murphy on the HBO drama Oz
Seán Clohessy (born 1931), retired Irish sportsperson
Sean Clohessy (born 1986), English professional footballer for Conference side Salisbury City